GN-108036 is a distant galaxy discovered and confirmed by the Subaru Telescope and the Keck Observatory located in Hawaii; its study was also completed by the Hubble Space Telescope and the Spitzer Space Telescope.

The redshift was z = 7.2, meaning the light of the galaxy took nearly 13 billion years to reach Earth and therefore its formation dates back to 750 million years after the Big Bang . It has a high rate of star formation, at a rate of 100 solar masses per year, or about 30 times more than the Milky Way that is 5 times larger and 100 times more massive.

See also
List of the most distant astronomical objects

References

Galaxies
Ursa Major (constellation)
Dwarf irregular galaxies
Astronomical objects discovered in 2011